

Background
There are existing sub-sections on religious denominations to deal with Christian lay people in politics, e.g. List of LDS politicians. This list is for politicians who also do Christian pastoral work, both ordained clergy and evangelists or theologians. It is therefore not appropriate to add Christian lay people to the list, although some noted theologians in the laity are included as relational.

List

Anglican
John Bani – President and head of state of Vanuatu from 25 March 1998 until 24 March 2004; Anglican priest
Timothy Beaumont, Baron Beaumont of Whitley – UK politician; first member of the House of Lords to sit as a member of the Green Party; Anglican priest
Dennis Drainville - New Democratic MPP for Ontario from 1990-1993. Later Anglican Bishop of Quebec from 2009-2017.
Stephen Green, Baron Green of Hurstpierpoint - Conservative Minister of State for Trade and Investment from 2011-2013, Member of House of Lords Temporal since 2010, Church of England priest
Lee Jae-joung – National Assembly member and Unification Minister of South Korea; Anglican priest
Walter Lini – founding Prime Minister of Vanuatu (succeeded by Bani); Anglican priest
Peter Douglas Koon - Hong Kong Anglican Priest, provincial secretary general of Hong Kong Sheng Kung Hui, Member of the Beijing Municipal Committee of the Chinese People’s Political Consultative Conference, Member of the Hong Kong Legislative Council
J. G. MacManaway  British Unionist who was disqualified from sitting on Parliament due to his status as a priest; Church of Ireland priest
Jacob Mountain - Canadian Politician. Member of the Legislative Council of Lower Canada from 1793 - 1825 and a Member of the Legislative Council of Upper Canada from 1793-1825. 1st Anglican Bishop of Quebec.
Wavel Ramkalawan - Anglican priest and 5th President of the Seychelles
John Terris - Anglican priest, Labour politician, Deputy Speaker (hence also Acting Speaker), and Chairman of Committees of the New Zealand House of Representatives from 1984 to 1990. Mayor of Lower Hutt City 1995-2004.
K.H. Ting -Anglican priest, Bishop of Chekiang, vice-chairman of the Chinese People's Political Consultative Conference (1989–2008), and a member of the National People's Congress, China's legislature.

Baptist
Benny M. Abante – former two-termed Congressman of the Philippines; awarded as Most Outstanding Congressmen of Philippines in the 13th and 14th Congresses; founder and pastor of Metropolitan Bible Baptist Church in the Philippines
William Aberhart – founder of the Social Credit Party of Alberta
Chuck Baldwin – United States Constitution Party activist and Baptist pastor
E.W. Jackson  Lawyer and Baptist Minister and bishop; candidate for Lieutenant Governor of Virginia
Ross Clifford – Australian politician; New South Wales Legislative Council and Australian Senate candidate; Baptist theologian
Thomas Clement "Tommy" Douglas – Canadian social democratic politician and Baptist minister; elected to the Canadian House of Commons in 1935 as a member of the Co-operative Commonwealth Federation (CCF); became the Saskatchewan CCF's leader, then the seventh Premier of Saskatchewan, 1944-1961
Walter E. Fauntroy – former member of United States Congress and Baptist pastor
Ernie Fletcher – Governor of Kentucky, 2003–2007
James Garrard – Governor of Kentucky, 1796–1804
William H. Gray – former Congressman and minister
Benjamin Hooks – American civil rights leader and Baptist minister
Mike Huckabee – former governor of Arkansas and Baptist minister
Tim Hutchinson – former Senator from Arkansas and former Baptist pastor
Jesse Jackson – civil rights activist and Baptist minister
James Lankford – former member of the United States House of Representative (2011-2015) and current United States Senator from the State of Oklahoma. Lankford served as a student ministry and evangelism specialist with the Baptist General Convention of Oklahoma and Falls Creek Baptist Conference Center. He is a graduate of Southwestern Baptist Theological Seminary in Fort Worth, TX.
Martin Luther King Jr. – civil rights activist and Baptist minister
Ron Lewis – Republican member of the United States House of Representatives from Kentucky between 1994 and 2009; Baptist minister
Adam Clayton Powell Jr. – thirteen term Congressman from Harlem, New York City (1945-1971); Pastor Abyssinian Baptist Church in Harlem (1937-1972)
Pat Robertson – Republican supporter, former United States presidential nomination candidate, and former Baptist pastor.
Raphael Warnock – United States Senator from Georgia, elected January 2020. Senior pastor at Ebenezer Baptist Church.

Roman Catholicism
Barthélemy Boganda
Jean-Bertrand Aristide – former President of Haiti; former Catholic priest
Ernesto Cardenal – former Minister for Culture for Nicaragua and Catholic priest
James Renshaw Cox – US Presidency candidate and Catholic priest
Robert Drinan – Roman Catholic Jesuit priest, lawyer, human rights activist, and Democratic US Representative from Massachusetts
Jerome D'Souza – Indian Jesuit, member of the Constituent Assembly of India 1946–50
Ivan Grubišić – Roman Catholic priest, sociologist, and independent representative in the Croatian Parliament
Andrej Hlinka – Slovak public activist and Catholic priest
 Theodor Innitzer (later Cardinal Innitzer) – Austrian Minister of Social Administration (1929–1930)
 Ludwig Kaas – prominent German politician during Weimar Republic and Catholic priest
 Gabriel Wilhelmus Manek, S.V.D. - Member of Provincial Parliament (M.P.P) of East Indonesia
 Hugo Kołłątaj – Polish social and political activist, political thinker, historian, philosopher and Catholic priest
 Fernando Arturo de Meriño – President of the Dominican Republic (1880–1882)
 Mihovil Pavlinović – Roman Catholic priest, writer, and People's Party representative in the Diet of Dalmatia, Croatian Parliament and Austro-Hungarian Imperial Council
 Gabriel Richard – French Roman Catholic priest who became a delegate from Michigan Territory to the US House of Representatives
 Ignaz Seipel – Chancellor of Austria for two stints during the 1920s
 Josip Juraj Strossmayer  bishop of the Roman Catholic Diocese of Đakovo, leader of the People's Party, member of the Croatian Parliament, prefect of the Virovitica County, and President of the Croatian Royal Board
Stanisław Staszic – Polish priest, philosopher, statesman, geologist, scholar, poet and writer; a leader of the Polish Enlightenment; famous for works related to the "Great" or "Four-Year Sejm" (1788–1792) and its Constitution of 3 May 1791
 Luigi Sturzo – one of the founders of the Italian People's Party; Catholic priest
 Jozef Tiso – fascist Slovak politician of the SPP; Roman Catholic priest who became a deputy of the Czechoslovak parliament, a member of the Czechoslovak government, and finally the President of Independent Slovak Republic from 1939–1945, allied with Nazi Germany
 Beda Weber – German Benedictine professor, author, and member of the Frankfurt Parliament

Eastern Catholic Churches
 Paul Weyrich – U.S. conservative political activist and commentator, ordained protodeacon in the Melkite Greek Catholic Church

Congregational Church
Samuel C. Fessenden – U.S. Congressman, pastor
Washington Gladden – leading American Congregational church pastor leading member of the Progressive Movement, serving for two years as a member of the Columbus, Ohio city council
Derek Jones – first Mayor of Gaborone, Botswana 1966–68
Fred Nile – New South Wales Legislative Council (Australia) member and Fellowship of Congregational Churches minister

Disciples of Christ
James A. Garfield – preacher, teacher, and lawyer from Ohio before becoming a Congressman and later the 20th President of the United States
Gerald L. K. Smith – founder of the quasi-fascist America First Party; Disciples of Christ minister
Jim Spainhower – U.S. politician from Missouri and former Disciples of Christ minister

Dutch Reformed Church
Thomas François Burgers – President of the South African Republic 1871–77; pastor
Rowan Cronjé – Rhodesian/South African politician, Member of Parliament and cabinet minister
Abraham Kuyper – Dutch politician, journalist, statesman and theologian; founded the Anti-Revolutionary Party and was Prime Minister of the Netherlands between 1901 and 1905; Dutch Reformed Church minister
Daniel François Malan – former Prime Minister of South Africa and minister

Eastern Orthodox Churches
 Boulos Basili – priest, first priest to enter the Egyptian Assembly in 1971 after winning a free election in his district Shoubra, in Cairo, Egypt; served in the parliament until 1975
Miron Cristea – first Patriarch of the Romanian Orthodox Church and Prime Minister of Romania
 Damaskinos – Archbishop of Athens and All Greece (primate of the Church of Greece) and Regent of Greece (1944–1946) for the exiled King George II
Makarios III – archbishop and primate of the autocephalous Cypriot Orthodox Church (1950–1977) and first President of the Republic of Cyprus (1960–1977)
Fan S. Noli – Albanian Orthodox bishop and politician, who served briefly as prime minister and regent of Albania in 1924
Feofan Prokopovich – archbishop and statesman in the Russian Empire, elaborated and implemented Peter the Great's reform of the Russian Orthodox Church
Mitro Repo – Finnish Orthodox Christian priest, member of the European Parliament from 2009 until 2014, elected as an independent candidate on the Social Democratic Party's ticket.

Episcopalian
Bernadine Craft - Former Member of Wyoming House of Representatives and Wyoming’s State Senate.
John Danforth – former United States Ambassador to the United Nations and former Republican United States Senator from Missouri; ordained Episcopal priest
Kim Jackson - Democratic Georgia State Senator. First openly out LGBT state senator in Georgian history.
Wythe Leigh Kinsolving – Episcopal priest, essayist and campaigner for Democratic candidates in 1910s-1930s, and against US participation in World War II in late 1930s through 1941
James Kilbourne- Episcopal Priest, surveyor, and Democratic-Republican member of the Ohio legislature and the US House of Representatives

Evangelist
Charles Colson – chief counsel for President of the United States Richard Nixon from 1969 to 1973 and was one of the Watergate Seven; maintains a variety of media channels which discuss contemporary issues from an Evangelical Christian worldview; his views are typically consistent with a politically conservative interpretation of evangelical Christianity
Marcelo Crivella Evangelical pastor, mayor of Rio de Janeiro
Eduardo Villanueva (born 6 October 1946) –  known as Bro. Eddie; religious and political leader in the Philippines; 2010 Philippine presidential candidate; founder and leader of the Jesus is Lord Church
Dan Johnson (1960-2017) –  known as the "Pope;" Elected to the Kentucky House of Representatives for the 49th District; Committed suicide after allegations and investigations for child molestation

Evangelical Lutheran
Lauri Ingman – Archbishop of Turku (1930–1934), Prime Minister of Finland (1918–1919, 1924–1925)
Dean Johnson – former majority leader of the Minnesota Senate; minister in the Evangelical Lutheran Church in America

Lutheran
Ida Auken – Denmark
Margrete Auken – Denmark
Kjell Magne Bondevik – Norwegian Lutheran minister and politician; Prime Minister of Norway from 1997 to 2000, and from 2001 to 2005
 Joachim Gauck – President of Germany from 2012 to 2017
Walter H. Moeller – American politician of the Democratic party; entered a Lutheran seminary in 1935 and served as a pastor in the 1940s and after his retirement from politics
Frederick Muhlenberg  First Speaker of the US House of Representatives; 1793–1795.

Methodist

Canaan Banana – president of Zimbabwe and Methodist minister
Henry Augustus Buchtel – American public official and educator, ordained to the Methodist Episcopal ministry and served for a year as a missionary in Bulgaria
John Bull – American clergyman and physician who represented Missouri in the US Congress in 1833 and 1834
Emanuel Cleaver – United Methodist pastor and a Democratic politician from the state of Missouri; elected to the United States House of Representatives in November 2004 to represent 
Robert W. Edgar – former Congressman and Methodist pastor
Robert P. Shuler – Prohibition Party candidate who received the highest vote in any election in US history; Methodist pastor
Donald Soper, Baron Soper – prominent Methodist minister, socialist and pacifist
Ted Strickland – Governor of Ohio, briefly a United Methodist pastor
Silas C. Swallow – U.S. Methodist preacher and prohibitionist politician
George Thomas, 1st Viscount Tonypandy – lay preacher, British and Welsh Labour M.P. in the House of Commons and served as Speaker of the House
Aaron S. Watkins – Prohibition Party candidate and Methodist minister
Robert L. Williams – third Governor of Oklahoma and Methodist minister
Terry Wynn – Methodist local preacher and Member of the European Parliament

Pentecostal
Aniym Pius Aniym pentecostal pastor, president of Nigerian senate
Andrew Evans – South Australian Legislative Council (Family First Party) member and Pentecostal Christian pastor
Anne McBride – American politician ordained in the Assemblies of God
Frederick Chiluba – Pentecostal pastor, President of Zambia
Judy Turner – New Zealand politician, pastoral and community worker at New Life Churches, New Zealand

Presbyterian
William H. Hudnut III – Presbyterian minister, Congressional representative from Indiana 1972–1974, four-term mayor of Indianapolis
Ian Paisley – First Minister of Northern Ireland, veteran politician and church leader in Northern Ireland; founding member and former Moderator of the Free Presbyterian Church of Ulster
Ham Tae-Young – 3rd Vice-President of the Republic of Korea, judge during the Korean Empire, Korean independence and nationalist leader
Stephanie Stahl Hamilton – Ordained PCUSA minister, Democratic member of both Arizona House of Representatives and the state senate
Larry Pittman – Republican member of the North Carolina General Assembly and ordained minister in the Presbyterian Church of America
James Smith – Presbyterian minister who was appointed to a diplomatic post in Scotland by President Abraham Lincoln
Norman Thomas - Presbyterian minister who was a six-time presidential nominee for the Socialist Party of America.
John Witherspoon – signatory of the United States Declaration of Independence as a representative of New Jersey; the only active clergyman to sign the Declaration
Arnold Nordmeyer - Presbyterian Minister, Minister of Finance (1957–1960), Leader of the Labour Party and Leader of the Opposition (1963–1965).

United Church
Bill Blaikie – retired Deputy Speaker of the House of Commons of Canada from 2006 to 2008; a Member of Parliament since 1979, representing the Winnipeg riding of Elmwood–Transcona and its antecedents as a member of the New Democratic Party; Minister of United Church of Canada
Lorne Calvert – former premier of the Canadian province of Saskatchewan and current leader of Her Majesty's Loyal Opposition, as leader of the Saskatchewan New Democratic Party; ordained minister of United Church of Canada
Cheri DiNovo - NDP MPP for Ontario’s Provincial Parliament and ordained United Church of Canada minister.
Brian Howe – Australian politician, was Deputy Prime Minister in the Labor government of Paul Keating, and minister of Uniting Church in Australia
Stanley Knowles – Canadian parliamentarian; United Church minister
Doug Lauchlan – Canadian politician, minister and educator, ordained minister in the United Church of Canada
David MacDonald – United Church of Canada minister and a former Canadian politician and author
Doug Martindale – politician in Manitoba, Canada; member of the Legislative Assembly of Manitoba since 1990, serving as a member of the New Democratic Party; ordained United Church minister
Davis McCaughey – key architect in the formation of the Uniting Church in Australia; Governor of Victoria 1986–1992
Keith Seaman – Uniting Church in Australia
Lloyd Stinson – politician in Manitoba, Canada; leader of that province's Co-operative Commonwealth Federation (CCF) from 1953 to 1959; ordained United Church minister
Andrew Young – civil rights activist; former mayor of Atlanta, Georgia; America's first African-American ambassador to the United Nations; United Church of Christ pastor

Other
Gregorio Aglipay – founded Philippine Independent Church
Harold Albrecht – Brethren in Christ
Benjamin W. Arnett – Ohio State Legislature politician and African Methodist Episcopal Church pastor
Graham Capill – Reformed Churches of New Zealand
William Irvine – Methodist, then Unitarian
Donald Malinowski – Polish National Catholic Church
Kenneth Meshoe – Hope of Glory Tabernacle
Gordon Moyes – New South Wales Legislative Council (Australia), Christian Democratic Party member, Churches of Christ in Australia minister
Douglas Nicholls – Churches of Christ in Australia
Clementa C. Pinckney – African Methodist Episcopal
Hiram Rhodes Revels – African Methodist Episcopal
Efraín Ríos Montt – Church of the Word

Unclassified
 Scott Craig – Pastor of Bighorn Canyon Community Church; has represented district 33 in the South Dakota House of Representatives since 11 January 2013
 Jerone Davison - Pastor in Maricopa County, Arizona; Republican candidate for Arizona's 4th congressional district.
Reinhold Niebuhr – Christian Realism; in his younger days he was a socialist candidate for New York State Senate
Wavel Ramkalawan – Seychelles politician and priest
Tuve Skånberg
Albert Edward Smith – Communist Party of Canada politician, but considered himself Christian throughout
William Horace Temple – Christian Socialist
László Tőkés – Bishop in Reformed Church in Romania and involved in the Democratic Union of Hungarians in Romania
Tim Walberg – non-denominational Protestant

Sources
Political graveyard clergy/politicians section

References

Politics, pastors in
Christianity and politics